The 1970 NHL Expansion Draft was the second expansion draft of the National Hockey League (NHL). The draft was held on June 10, 1970, a day before the 1970 NHL Amateur Draft. The expansion draft was held to allow the Buffalo Sabres and Vancouver Canucks to acquire players for the upcoming .

Draft results

Notes

Trades
June 10, 1970: The Sabres traded Tom Webster to the Detroit Red Wings in exchange for goaltender Roger Crozier.
October 2, 1970: The Sabres traded Craig Cameron to the St. Louis Blues in exchange for Ron Anderson.
October 1970: The Sabres traded Howie Menard to the California Golden Seals in exchange for cash.

Other
Gary Edwards was loaned to the Kansas City Blues for the  before being traded to the Los Angeles Kings.

References
General

External links
 1970 NHL Expansion Draft player stats at The Internet Hockey Database

Draft
Buffalo Sabres
Ex
National Hockey League expansion drafts